Satha Chaurasi (also known as Laghu Mewar) refers to an area in the west of the Indian state of Uttar Pradesh, where the majority population belongs to the members of the Rajputs (Thakur) community. It falls within the boundaries of the Ghaziabad, Meerut and Muzaffarnagar Lok Sabha constituencies. Satha translates as group of sixty and chaurasi as group of eighty-four. These numbers may have had a significant socio-political context in the medieval period as a definition of scope for territorial and lineal boundaries.

The region includes Ghaziabad, Hapur, Gautam Budh Nagar district, Bulandshahr, Dadri, Baghpat, Meerut, Muzaffarnagar. There are 60 villages where members of the Gehlot clan, who are descendants of Khumaan Rao, son of founder of Mewar Bappa Rawal are majority, and 84 villages where the Tomar Rajputs, who were descendants of  founder of Delhi Anangpal Tomar are majority.

References

Rajputs
Regions of Uttar Pradesh